Glasson is a surname. Notable people with the surname include:

Bill Glasson (golfer), American golfer
Bill Glasson (surgeon), Australian surgeon and politician
Charlotte Glasson, British musician, composer and bandleader
Clark Glasson (1913–1994), American golf course designer and constructor
Ernest Désiré Glasson (1839–1907), French academic and jurist
Gregory S. Glasson, American musician
Jamie Glasson, English cricketer
Paul Glasson, Australian business person active in China
Steve Glasson, Australian lawn bowls player
Stephanie Glasson, model and actress, Playboy playmate